Nadim Sabagh (born August 4, 1985 in Latakia, Syria) is a Syrian footballer. He currently plays for Tishreen, which competes in the Syrian Premier League the top division in Syria. He plays as a defender, wearing the number 12 jersey for Arbil and for the Syrian national football team he wears the number 13 shirt.

Career statistics

International goals

Appearances in major competitions

Honour and Titles

Club
Al-Jaish
Syrian Premier League: 2009–10
Erbil
Iraqi Premier League: 2011–12
Al-Zawraa
Iraqi Premier League: 2017–18
Iraq FA Cup: 2016–17
Iraqi Super Cup: 2017

References

External links
 
 

1985 births
Living people
People from Latakia
Association football defenders
Syrian footballers
Syria international footballers
Syrian expatriate footballers
Expatriate footballers in Iraq
Syrian expatriate sportspeople in Iraq
Al-Jaish Damascus players
Tishreen SC players
Erbil SC players
2011 AFC Asian Cup players
2019 AFC Asian Cup players
Syrian Premier League players